Events from 1988 in England

Incumbent

Events

January
 9 January – One of the worst incidents of football hooliganism this season sees 41 suspected hooligans arrested at the FA Cup third round tie between Arsenal and Millwall at Highbury.

February

March

 6 March – SAS soldiers shot dead three unarmed IRA members in Gibraltar, leading to widespread republican criticism.

April

May

June

 21 June – The Poole explosion of 1988 caused 3,500 people to be evacuated out of the town centre in the biggest peacetime evacuation the country had seen since the World War II.

July

August

September

October

November

December

Births
 14 January – Sian Honnor, lawn bowler

Deaths
 14 August – Margaret Sampson, Anglican nun.

See also
1988 in Northern Ireland
1988 in Scotland
1988 in Wales

References

 
England
Years of the 20th century in England
1980s in England